Zieria scopulus is a plant in the citrus family Rutaceae and endemic to south-eastern Queensland. It is an open, compact shrub with wiry branches, three-part leaves and groups of up to twenty white flowers with four petals and four stamens, although only a small number of flowers are open at the same time. It is only known from two peaks of volcanic rock near Ipswich.

Description
The sides of the leaflets are wavy, especially near the tip. The flowers are arranged in groups of up to twenty in leaf axils, although only one to three are open at the same time. The flowers are surrounded by scale-like bracts which remain during flowering. There are four stamens.

Taxonomy and naming
Zieria scopulus was first formally described in 2007 by Marco Duretto and Paul Irwin Forster from a specimen collected from Mount Elliot near Ipswich and the description was published in Austrobaileya. The specific epithet (scopulus) is a Latin word meaning "projecting rock, shelf, ledge or cliff" referring to the habitat of this species.

Distribution and habitat
This zieria is only known from Mount Elliot and Flinders Peak where it grows in stony cracks and crevices of trachyte.

References

scopulus
Sapindales of Australia
Flora of Queensland
Taxa named by Marco Duretto
Plants described in 2007
Taxa named by Paul Irwin Forster